The Nakajima E2N was a Japanese reconnaissance aircraft of the inter-war years. It was a single-engine, two-seat, sesquiplane seaplane with twin main floats.

Design and development
The E2N was developed in the 1920s for the Imperial Japanese Navy as a short range reconnaissance floatplane suitable for catapult launch from cruisers and battleships. It was a wooden twin-float sesquiplane, carrying a crew of two in open cockpits and having folding wings. This layout gave better downwards view than the monoplanes proposed by Aichi and Yokosuka, and the design was selected becoming Japan's first locally designed shipboard reconnaissance seaplane.

Operational history
The E2N served with the Navy as the Nakajima Navy Type 15 Reconnaissance Floatplane (一五式水上偵察機). 80 examples were produced between 1927 and 1929 by Nakajima and Kawanishi; of these, two were bought for civil fishery patrol duties. The Navy machines were withdrawn from front-line units in the 1930s, being replaced by the Nakajima E4N, and either being reassigned to training duties or sold to civil buyers.

Variants
E2N1 (Type 15-1 Reconnaissance Seaplane)
Short-range reconnaissance aircraft.
E2N2 (Type 15-2 Reconnaissance Seaplane)
Trainer version with dual controls.

Operators

 Imperial Japanese Navy

Specifications (E2N)

See also

References

Notes

Bibliography

E02N, Nakajima
E02N
Sesquiplanes
Single-engined tractor aircraft
Aircraft first flown in 1927